Traveloka is an Indonesian technology company focused on travel and ticketing. Operating a services website of the same name and based out of Jakarta, Indonesia, Traveloka is active in six countries, and in 2022 remained the largest online travel app in Southeast Asia. Founded in 2012 as a travel search engine, it now also offers services such as attraction tickets, activities, transportation rentals, and restaurant vouchers. It also provides financial services such as credit and insurance.  Classified as a unicorn company and regarded as functionally similar to Expedia, in 2022 it was valued approximately at US$3 billion.

History

Founding (2012-2013)

Traveloka was established in February 2012 by three Indonesian software engineers: Ferry Unardi, Albert, and Derianto Kusuma. Unardi and Albert had met while studying computer science in the United States, while Unardi met Kusuma while both were interning at Microsoft. All three ultimately worked in Silicon Valley. Unardi, frequently encountering travel difficulties when visiting his hometown of Padang, came upon the idea of a website to ease travel logistics in Indonesia. As he had no business experience, he began an MBA program at Harvard Business School. However, in early 2012, the Indonesian tech market was attracting international investors and e-ticketing was becoming more popular, so Unardi dropped out early and the three founders moved to Jakarta and established Traveloka.

After an early iteration was completed in February 2012, Traveloka launched in September 2012 as a travel metasearch site, serving as both an aggregator and search engine for flights in Indonesia. In November 2012, the company raised an undisclosed amount of seed funding from East Ventures. With Unardi serving as CEO and Kusuma as chief technology officer (CTO),  they also implemented 24-hour customer service in multiple languages and moved from a metasearch model to a full online travel agency (OTA) and ticket reservation website. Also in September 2013, the company announced a series investment by Global Founders Capital. Redesigning the portal and relaunching in September 2013, Traveloka began allowing users to purchase flights using various payment methods, taking between a 10 to 15% commission on bookings.

Expansion (2014-2018)
Traveloka introduced hotel bookings in July 2014. It then launched apps for iOS and Android in August 2014, and by the end of the year, had 10 million visitors each month. In May 2015, comScore ranked Traveloka as Indonesia’s number one flight search and booking service. Traveloka first entered Thailand in 2015, and by September, it had partnerships in Southeast Asia with 33 hotels and airlines. The company expanded rapidly in 2016, opening regional offices in Thailand, Singapore, Malaysia, the Philippines and Vietnam. Train tickets and food features were added that year, as well as ticketing for Indonesian tourist attractions. In Traveloka's first public funding round since 2013, in July 2017 Traveloka raised $350 million from Global Founders Capital, GIC, the Qatar Investment Authority, and Expedia, which also became a minority investor. The investment valued Traveloka at over US$1 billion, making Traveloka a unicorn company. Funds were earmarked for developing machine learning and artificial intelligence, investments, and hiring more staff. 

By August 2017, according to Reuters, Traveloka had incorporated "100,000 hotels, apartments and other forms of accommodation" in Southeast Asia into its booking options, and had partnerships with around 100 airlines. It added online check-ins in December 2017, as well as airport transportation services via a taxi company. In December 2018, the company acquired three online travel agencies: Pegipegi from Indonesia, Mytour from Vietnam, and Travelbook from the Philippines, all previously subsidiaries of Recruit Holdings in Japan – for $67 million. In May 2018, Traveloka launched a mobile app feature offering dining information. 2018 also oversaw the resignation of Kusuma from his role as Traveloka's chief technology officer, citing a "clash of aspirations".

New services (2019)
By 2019, Traveloka was one of four unicorns in Indonesia, as well as the largest online travel startup in Southeast Asia. Traveloka opened a research & development (R&D) center in Bangalore, India in January 2019. In March 2019, AirAsia permanently withdrew sales of its flights from Traveloka, citing Traveloka's lack of explanation for several AirAsia Indonesia flights that had been unlisted the month prior. By 2019, Traveloka had ventured into financial services for the first time. In 2019, it started a credit card scheme with Bank Rakyat Indonesia, marking the company's move into financial services. 

In June 2019, Traveloka introduced a new lifestyle business division, branding the feature Traveloka Xperience. Initially available in Thailand, it allowed for searching and booking travel-related activities and lifestyle products. It also launched a home protection insurance plan as well as visa insurance coverage in Indonesia in 2019. Traveloka began listing villas and apartments to book in September 2019. By October 2019, it had launched its PayLater card with Bank Rakyat Indonesia. Traveloka also developed a shariah-compliant health insurance program called Bebas Handal for Muslim customers alongside Hong Kong-based FWD Group. Movie-booking in Thailand was also added in November 2019 through Major Cineplex. Also in 2019, Traveloka partnered with the Indonesian Tourism Ministry on the Wonderful Indonesia tourist marketing campaign, also collaborating with the Singapore Tourism Board to open trip kiosks in Singapore. Traveloka in 2019 had 2,500 staff members and 20 products, with around 50 million downloads of its app. That year, a survey of 1,204 Indonesian "millennials" showed that 79% used Traveloka regularly.

Pandemic and recent (2020-2023)
During the early months of the coronavirus pandemic in 2020, Traveloka began experiencing surges in refund and rescheduling requests. With flight bookings dropping to essentially zero, in April 2020, Traveloka laid off 100 staff members and over the next half year, refunded around 150,000 flight tickets equating to $100 million. In response, the company began adding features such as its "Buy Now, Stay Later" feature to allow for flexible booking. To help restore its cash flow during the pandemic, its Xperience sub-brand was also used to host online activities like cooking classes with professional chefs. Traveloka also began advertising other online experiences and "flash sale livestreams," and began bundling flights with COVID-19 tests.

Through Traveloka Xperience, in June 2020, Traveloka began listing polymerase chain reaction (PCR) and rapid testing in Indonesia, booking around 600,000 people for vaccinations over the next year and a half. Also in June 2020, Traveloka started its Traveloka Clean Partners campaign to align with government health measures.  A new funding round was completed in 2020 with the Qatar Investment Authority (QIA) as a lead investor. Demand for travel accommodation was recovering by October 2020, according to Traveloka, and by the end of 2020, Traveloka's travel business had returned to profitability. After reports that Traveloka was considering a SPAC merger in the United States, Traveloka halted discussions over a SPAC IPO with Bridgetown Holdings in September 2021. In 2021, Fast Company named Traveloka one of its 100 Best Workplaces for Innovatorshttps://www.fastcompany.com/best-workplaces-for-innovators/2021?view=1 in the International category.https://www.fastcompany.com/90659111/best-workplaces-innovators-2021-international In January 2022, Traveloka remained the largest online travel start-up in Southeast Asia, and was valued at $3 billion. In September 2022 it raised USD$300m. In 2022 as well, Traveloka closed Traveloka Mart, Traveloka Send, and Traveloka Eats, all of whichhttps://www.techinasia.com/traveloka-close-eats-send had been launched during its diversification of services during the pandemic. After appointing brand ambassadors, in April 2022, Accor properties in 13 countries were added to Traveloka's booking platform, and Traveloka also partnered with Bank Jago to disburse loans through Traveloka's PayLater feature in Indonesia.

Website

Traveloka is a services and e-commerce site available in multiple languages. Classifying its products and services in the categories of travel, local services, and financial services, the app has been downloaded over 100 million times and has around 40 million monthly active users. It is claimed that the website lists around 150 airlines covering a total of 200,000 domestic and international flight routes. More than 2,500,000 hotels, villas, and guesthouses in 100 countries are also listed. According to Traveloka, it allows for searching and booking in areas such as transportation and lodging, and also provides lifestyle products and services, for example attraction tickets, activities, car rental, and restaurant vouchers.  Customer services are provided 24-7 in local languages. The platform allowed four methods of communication in 2017: a desktop portal, a mobile portal, iOS and Android applications, and direct calls.

In relation to financial services, it offers wealth management services, insurance, financing and credit. Other features in the Traveloka platform include the prebooking service Buy Now Stay Later, the live-streaming service LIVEstyle, the blogging platform Kampoeng Traveloka, and the multiplayer game Sodaloka.

See also

List of unicorn startup companies
List of Indonesian inventions and discoveries

References

External links

Online retailers of Indonesia
Companies based in Jakarta
Transport companies established in 2012
Indonesian brands
Travel ticket search engines
Indonesian companies established in 2012